Zyrphelis decumbens is a perrenial species of plant from the Bainskloof Mountains in South Africa.

Description 
The leaves, which are thinnest at the base, are hairy. The yellow flowers are present between October and December and have white to pale purple rays.

Distribution and habitat 
This species is found growing on rocky sandstone slopes on the Bainskloof Mountains in South Africa.

Conservation 
This species is considered to be rare by the South African National Biodiversity Institute (SANBI). It has an area of occurrence of only . The region in which it grows, however, is not currently threatened and the population is considered to be stable.

References 

Plants described in 1994
Astereae
Flora of South Africa